The Jacobean style is the second phase of Renaissance architecture in England, following the Elizabethan style. It is named after King James VI and I, with whose reign (1603–1625 in England) it is associated.  At the start of James' reign there was little stylistic break in architecture, as Elizabethan trends continued their development. However, his death in 1625 came as a decisive change towards more classical architecture, with Italian influence, was in progress, led by Inigo Jones; the style this began is sometimes called Stuart architecture, or English Baroque (though the latter term may be regarded as starting later).

Courtiers continued to build large prodigy houses, even though James spent less time on summer progresses round his realm than Elizabeth had. The influence of Flemish and German Northern Mannerism increased, now often executed by immigrant craftsmen and artists, rather than obtained from books as in the previous reign. There continued to be very little building of new churches, though a considerable amount of modifications to old ones, but a great deal of secular building.

Characteristics

The reign of James VI of Scotland (or James I of England (1603–1625)), a disciple of the new scholarship, saw the first decisive adoption of Renaissance motifs in a free form communicated to England through German and Flemish carvers rather than directly from Italy. Although the general lines of Elizabethan design remained, there was a more consistent and unified application of formal design, both in plan and elevation. Much use was made of columns and pilasters, round-arch arcades, and flat roofs with openwork parapets. These and other classical elements appeared in a free and fanciful vernacular rather than with any true classical purity. With them were mixed the prismatic rustications and ornamental detail of scrolls, straps, and lozenges also characteristic of Elizabethan design. The style influenced furniture design and other decorative arts.

History and examples

Reproductions of the Classical orders had already found their way into English architecture during the reign of Queen Elizabeth I, frequently based upon John Shute's The First and Chief Grounds of Architecture, published in 1563, with two other editions in 1579 and 1584. In 1577, three years before the commencement of Wollaton Hall, a copybook of the orders was brought out in Antwerp by Hans Vredeman de Vries. Although nominally based on the description of the orders by Vitruvius, the author indulged freely not only in his rendering of them, but in suggestions of his own, showing how the orders might be employed in various buildings. Those suggestions were of a most decadent type, so that even the author deemed it advisable to publish a letter from a canon of the Church, stating that there was nothing in his architectural designs that was contrary to religion. It is to publications of this kind that Jacobean architecture owes the perversion of its forms and the introduction of strap work and pierced crestings, which appear for the first time at Wollaton Hall (1580); at Bramshill House, Hampshire (1607–1612), and in Holland House, Kensington (1624), it receives its fullest development.

Hatfield House, built in its entirety by Robert Cecil, 1st Earl of Salisbury, between 1607 and 1611, is an example of the later extension of the Elizabethan prodigy house, with turreted Tudor-style wings at each end with their mullioned windows but the two wings linked by an Italianate Renaissance facade. This central facade, originally an open loggia, has been attributed to Inigo Jones himself; however, the central porch carries a heavier quasi-gatehouse emphasis, so the attribution is probably false.  Inside the house, the elaborately carved staircase demonstrates the Renaissance influence on English ornament.

Other Jacobean buildings of note are Crewe Hall, Cheshire; Hatfield House, Hertfordshire; Knole House, near Sevenoaks in Kent; Charlton House in Charlton, London; Holland House by John Thorpe; Plas Teg near Pontblyddyn, between Wrexham and Mold in Wales; Bank Hall in Bretherton; Castle Bromwich Hall near Solihull; Lilford Hall in Northamptonshire and Chastleton House in Oxfordshire.

Although the term is generally employed of the style which prevailed in England during the first quarter of the 17th century, its peculiar decadent detail will be found nearly twenty years earlier at Wollaton Hall, Nottingham, and in Oxford and Cambridge examples exist up to 1660, notwithstanding the introduction of the purer Italian style by Inigo Jones in 1619 at Whitehall.

In the Americas
In 1607 and 1620, England founded her first successful colonies: Jamestown, Virginia and Plymouth, Massachusetts. As with other settlers in the New World, the men and women that built the homes and buildings that formed the infrastructure of these towns and the others that followed over the coming century often built edifices that were consistent with Jacobean vernacular architecture in the portion of England that they originated from: for example, the clapboard common to houses in New England and later Nova Scotia to this day are derived from a local style of architecture popular in Northeast England in the early to mid 17th century. Historians often classify this architecture as a subtype of colonial American architecture,  called First Period architecture, however there is an enormous amount of overlap between the architecture of the commoner class in early 17th century England and colonial America architecture, where some of the key features of the Jacobean era often outlived James I and VI owing to less contact between the American colonists and the fashions of England.

When the Puritans arrived in the winter of 1620 in New England, there was very little time to waste owing to the bitterly cold weather and the fact that many of the occupants of the ship that brought them, the Mayflower, were very ill and needed to get into housing before circumstances could allow the diseases on board to spread further. Those that were still able bodied had to act quickly and as a result the first buildings of New England most resembled the wattle and daub cottages of the common people back home, especially of places like East Anglia and Devonshire, with the thatched roofs that remained common in England until the 1660s differing only in that the main material chosen for thatching was grass found in the local salt marshes. Most of these would have been hall and parlor dwellings with a simple central chimney, a feature of British architecture since the earlier Elizabethan era, a timber frame, a squat lower floor and an upper floor with bare beams and a space to be used for storage. Measurements of the archaeological remains of houses owned by Myles Standish and John Alden done in the mid nineteenth and the mid twentieth century in Duxbury, Massachusetts, a town across the harbor from Plymouth, also settled by the original Pilgrim Fathers, and inhabited just eight years later, reveal that the original homes were very narrow and small, averaging approximately forty feet long by fifteen feet wide. This concurs with the dimensions of houses that would have been found amongst the English commoner classes (specifically yeoman and small farmers) as evidenced by the surviving tax rolls of the Jacobean era.

Examples of original Jacobean architecture in the Americas include Drax Hall Great House and St. Nicholas Abbey, both located in Barbados, and Bacon's Castle in Surry County, Virginia.

In the 19th Century, the Jacobean Gothic or “Jacobethan” style was briefly popular. Excellent examples are Coxe Hall, Williams Hall, and Medbury Hall, which define the West and North sides of the quadrangle of Hobart College in Geneva, NY. Other notable collegiate examples include The University of Florida and Florida State University both designed by William Augustus Edwards.

See also

 Jacobean era
 Jacobean Revival

Notes

References

 Marcus Whiffen, An Introduction to Elizabethan and Jacobean Architecture (1952).
 J. Summerson, Architecture in Britain, 1530–1830 (rev. ed. 1963).
 The Columbia Encyclopedia, Sixth Edition. 2001.

 
Renaissance architecture in England
Architecture in England by period or style
British architectural styles
Stuart England
Architectural styles
Architecture in Barbados
17th-century architecture